Chicago P.D. is an American television drama on NBC spun off from Chicago Fire. The series focuses on a uniformed police patrol and the Intelligence Unit that pursues the perpetrators of the city's major street offenses. The series premiered on January 8, 2014.

The ninth season premiered on September 22, 2021.

Series overview

Episodes

Backdoor pilot (2013)

Season 1 (2014)

Season 2 (2014–15)

Season 3 (2015–16)

Season 4 (2016–17)

Season 5 (2017–18)

Season 6 (2018–19)

Season 7 (2019–20)

Season 8 (2020–21)

Season 9 (2021–22)

Season 10 (2022–23)

Home media

See also
 List of Chicago Fire episodes
 List of Chicago Med episodes
 List of Chicago Justice episodes

References

External links
 List of Chicago P.D. episodes at NBC
 

Lists of American crime drama television series episodes
Episodes